Yevtushenko or Evtushenko (Ukrainian: Євтушенко, Russian: Евтушенко) is a gender-neutral Ukrainian surname that originates from the Greek given name Eutychius. It may refer to:
Alexander Evtushenko (born 1993), Russian racing cyclist
Anatoli Yevtushenko (born 1934), Soviet handball coach
Sasha Yevtushenko (born 1979), director and producer for BBC Radio, son of Yevgeny
 Vadym Yevtushenko (born 1958), Ukrainian former footballer
Vladislava Evtushenko (born 1996), Russian actress, dancer, model and beauty pageant titleholder
 Yevgeny Yevtushenko (1933–2017), Soviet and Russian poet

See also
 
 
 Vladimir Yevtushenkov (born 1948), Russian tycoon

References

Ukrainian-language surnames